Dušan Petričić (born 10 May 1946) is a Serbian illustrator and caricaturist. He has illustrated numerous children's books and his caricatures have appeared in various newspapers and magazines from Politika to The New York Times, The Wall Street Journal and the Toronto Star.

Petričić has received numerous awards for his work including an IBBY Certificate of Honour, an Alberta Book Award for his illustrations in Tim Wynne-Jones' On Tumbledown Hill and many others. In 1989 he won the Levstik Award in Slovenia for his illustrations of Guliver med pritlikavci (Gulliver in Lilliput).
In 2001 the book The Longitude Prize for which he produced the illustrations won an honour at the Robert F. Sibert Informational Book Awards.

From 1993 to 2013, he lived and worked in Toronto, Ontario, Canada.

Selected works illustrated
 The Dance of the Violin, written by Kathy Stinson, 2017
 Zoomberry, written by Dennis Lee, 2016
 Snap!, written by Hazel Hutchins, 2015
 The Man with the Violin, written by Kathy Stinson, 2013
 In the Tree House, written by Andrew Larsen, 2013
 Mr. Zinger's Hat, Cary Fagan, 2012
 My Toronto, Petričić, 2011
 When Apples Grew Noses And White Horses Flew, Jan Andrews, 2011
 Better Together, Simon Shapiro, 2011
 Jacob Two-Two on the High Seas, Cary Fagan, 2009
 Jacob Two-Two Meets the Hooded Fang, Mordecai Richler, 2009
 Jacob Two-Two's First Spy Case, Mordecai Richler, 2009
 Jacob Two-Two and the Dinosaur, Mordecai Richler, 2009
 Mattland, Hazel Hutchins and Gail Herbert, 2008
 The Queen's Feet, Sarah Ellis, 2008
 On Tumbledown Hill, Tim Wynne-Jones, 2008
 The Longitude Prize, Joan Dash, 2008
 My New Shirt, Cary Fagan, 2007
 Lickety-Split, Robert Heidbreder, 2007
 Alphabad: Mischievous ABCs, Shannon Stewart, 2007
 Bashful Bob and Doleful Dorinda, Margaret Atwood, 2006
 Bagels from Benny, Aubrey Davis, 2005
 Rude Ramsay and the Roaring Radishes, Margaret Atwood, 2004
 Ned Mouse breaks away, Tim Wynne-Jones, 2003 
 Wings and Rockets: The Story of Women in Air and Space, Jeannine Atkins, 2003
 Grandmother Doll, Alice Bartels, 2001
 Earthlings Inside and Out: A Space Alien Studies the Human Body, Valerie Wyatt, 1999
 The Enormous Potato, Aubrey Davis, 1997
 La Grosse Patate, Aubrey Davis and Michel Bourque, 1997
 Bone Button Borscht, Aubrey Davis, 1996
 Let's Play: Traditional Games of Childhood, Camilla Gryski, 1996
 Scary Science: The Truth Behind Vampires, Witches, UFO's Ghosts and More, Sylvia Funston, 1996
 The Color of Things, Vivienne Shalom, 1995
 Guliver med pritlikavci (Gulliver in Lilliput), from the 1726 classic by Jonathan Swift, 1987

References

External links
 

1946 births
Artists from Belgrade
Artists from Toronto
Serbian expatriates in Canada
Living people
Levstik Award laureates
Serbian caricaturists
Canadian editorial cartoonists
Canadian illustrators